Portrait of Clare refers to:

 Portrait of Clare (novel), 1927 novel by Francis Brett Young
 Portrait of Clare (film), 1950 British film based on the novel